Tetramethylguanidine is an organic compound with the formula HNC(N(CH)).  This colourless liquid is a strong base, as judged by the high pK of it conjugate acid.

It was originally prepared from tetramethylthiourea via S-methylation and amination, but alternative methods start from cyanogen iodide.

Uses
Tetramethylguanidine is mainly used as a strong, non-nucleophilic base for alkylations, often as a substitute for the more expensive DBU and DBN. Since it is highly water-soluble, it is easily removed from mixtures in organic solvents. It is also used as a base-catalyst in the production of polyurethane.

References

Guanidines
Reagents for organic chemistry
Non-nucleophilic bases